David McCarthy (born 1949) is an Irish former Gaelic footballer. At club level he played with Clonakilty and University College Dublin and was also a member of the Cork senior football team.

Playing career

McCarthy first played Gaelic football and hurling at juvenile and underage levels with Clonakilty and won numerous divisional titles in both codes. As a boarder at the De La Salle College in Waterford, he won several shield competitions, two Abbot Cup titles and lined out in the Corn Uí Mhuirí. McCarthy's studies brought him to University College Dublin where he won a Sigerson Cup title in 1973, while he also won a Railway Cup medal with the Combined Universities team the same year. His senior career with the Clonakilty club spanned over 20 years, during which time he ended up on the losing side in the county finals in 1968 and 1983.

McCarthy first played for Cork as a member of the minor team and was an unused substitute in the 1967 All-Ireland minor final defeat of Laois. He never played with the under-21 team but earned selection on the junior team that won the Munster JFC title in 1972. McCarthy's performances in this grade resulted in an immediate call-up to the senior team and he was at left wing-forward when Cork beat Galway in the 1973 All-Ireland final. He also won consecutive Munster SFC titles, four consecutive Railway Cup medals with Munster and was included on the All-Star team in 1976. A car accident in 1979 brought McCarthy's inter-county career to an end.

Personal life

McCarthy's uncle, Humphrey O'Neill, was part of the Cork team that won the 1945 All-Ireland SFC. He qualified with a degree in agricultural science and worked as a secondary school teacher in Clonakilty Community College while also running the family newsagent.

Honours

University College Dublin
Sigerson Cup: 1973

Clonakilty
West Cork Junior A Hurling Championship: 1976, 1977, 1983

Cork
All-Ireland Senior Football Championship: 1973
Munster Senior Football Championship: 1973, 1974
Munster Junior Football Championship: 1972
All-Ireland Minor Football Championship: 1967
Munster Minor Football Championship: 1967

Combined Universities
Railway Cup: 1973

Munster
Railway Cup: 1975, 1976, 1977, 1978

References

1949 births
Living people
UCD Gaelic footballers
Clonakilty Gaelic footballers
Clonakilty hurlers
Cork inter-county Gaelic footballers
Munster inter-provincial Gaelic footballers
Gaelic football goalkeepers
People educated at De La Salle College Waterford